Sansür (En: Censorship) is a 1970 Turkish animated short directed by Tan Oral. The film won the grand prize at the 1970 TRT's Television Films Competition. It is then stated that the film will be shown on TV screens a week after the award ceremony, but the film is never aired on TV. Sansür was published as a book in 1977. But a court ruled to publish the book with a label stating "not suitable for those under 18" & "subject to threat".

Awards 
 1970 TRT’s Culture, Science and Arts Awards, Television Films Competition, 16 mm category, Grand Prize
 1975 Akşehir-Nasrettin Hoca short movie competition, Big Prize

References

External links
 

1970s animated short films
Turkish animated films
Turkish short films
Turkish animated short films
Censorship in Turkey
Film controversies in Turkey
Works about censorship
1970 films